Katagory V was an American heavy metal band from Salt Lake City, Utah that formed in 1999. Signed to Nightmare Records, Katagory V has released five studio albums. Their first album Present Day was released in 2001, and the band's most recent work Resurrect the Insurgence was released in May 2015.

History

Beginnings and debut album (1999−2002)
Formed in early 1999, Katagory V was founded by bassist Dustin Mitchell, guitarist Curtis Morell and drummer Matt Suiter after meeting at a local rock club in Salt Lake City, Utah.
Near the end of 1999 they would be joined by guitarist Ryan Taylor and vocalist Lynn Allers, and begin writing songs for their debut album Present Day, which would be self-released by the band in 2001. Present Day would create a buzz in the underground metal scene and gain the attention of Nightmare Records owner Lance King, who would then pick it up for distribution through his Record label in 2002.

Katagory V performed several live shows in Northern Utah throughout 2001 and 2002, and also appeared at the Classic Metal Festival II in Cleveland, Ohio, sharing the stage with Seven Witches and long-running heavy metal acts Anvil and Omen. A few months before their performance at the Classic Metal Festival II, guitarist Ryan Taylor would leave the band, forcing them to perform at this event as a quartet. Katagory V would start writing their 2nd album A New Breed of Rebellion in early 2002, and acquire guitarist Trevor Asire in late 2002 to fill the vacant slot left by Taylor. Katagory V would return to perform at the Classic Metal Festival III, now relocated to Chicago Heights, Illinois, alongside Twelfth Gate, Nasty Savage and Meliah Rage.

A New Breed of Rebellion (2003−2004)

Katagory V would be invited to perform at the world ProgPower USA IV festival as a showcase band in 2003, sharing the stage with Prymary and Stride. Their second album, A New Breed of Rebellion was due for release at this time, but would be held back several months and not see an official release until January 2004 through Metal Ages Records. Cover art for the album would be supplied by German artist Rainer Kalwitz. Trevor Asire would make the decision to part ways with the band for unrelated personal matters in January 2004, and would be replaced by Marc Hanson.

A New Breed of Rebellion would be known among the band's fans as a misunderstood classic, as it was often criticized in the media as being thin in production, far too technical and less song oriented compared their debut album, Present Day. In an attempt to redeem themselves amongst the media and some of their fans, Katagory V would make the decision to not promote the album with any live performances in 2004 and spend a majority of that year writing and rehearsing material for the follow-up to A New Breed of Rebellion. They entered the studio in October 2004 with producer Mike Fowkes and would spend the next six months recording the band's third album, The Rising Anger.

The Rising Anger (2004-2006)

Katagory V finished up the recording process of The Rising Anger in the spring of 2005, and bounced back with several live performances throughout the year, including and opening slot for Metal Church, an appearance at J. J. Kelly’s for the Chicago Powerfest with Imagika, Tad Morose and Morgana Lefay. and the Monsters of Metal show in Salt Lake City, Utah with Helstar, Agent Steel and Avengers of Blood. This particular show would also have a special appearance by Leatherwolf guitarist Geoff Gayer, who joined Katagory V on stage to perform the Leatherwolf song "The Calling" and featured Ronny Munroe of Metal Church as the announcer for the event.

At the beginning of 2006, Bassist Dustin Mitchell would be called upon to fill in on bass for legendary New York metal band Riot at a show in Salt Lake City, due to original bassist Pete Perez having suffered from an accident that left him unable to perform at this show. A few months later, the band would officially sign with Nightmare Records and release their 3rd album The Rising Anger. Cover artwork for the album would once again be handled by Rainer Kalwitz. This album would see Katagory V return to a more straight-ahead metal approach in their song writing, gaining several high-ranking reviews and bring their name into the forefront of many new fans, while regaining the respect amongst many older fans that felt alienated by the previous album. The band would immediately began working on songs for a fourth album, and only stop long enough to perform a one-off show in Las Vegas, Nevada with Leatherwolf before returning to the studio to record the album Hymns of Dissension in the beginning of 2007.

Hymns of Dissension (2007-2008)

Katagory V finalized the recording of their 4th album Hymns of Dissension in the spring of 2007 and would set out to perform several select shows, including a co-headlining show with Vicious Rumors and another with Agent Steel. They would also land a deal with Burning Star Records to release the album in Europe, an important move since a large proportion of the band's fans were located in the European territories. Swedish artist Mattias Norén would also be hired to handle the cover art for Hymns of Dissension. The band would set a date for a CD release party in their hometown of Salt Lake City, Utah to coincide with the upcoming release date of their fourth album, and stated they would be performing live at this event, however without long-time lead vocalist Lynn Allers. Katagory V would then announce Imagika frontman Norman Skinner as a temporary fill-in for this show. This announcement would leave many fans and media to speculate Alters' status with the band, and would grow even more suspicious when Katagory V announced that they would also be performing on New Year's Eve in Las Vegas, Nevada with Metal Church singer Ronny Munroe as his backing band.

Katagory V released their fourth album in October 2007 to a huge applause from fans and media, but would still keep their silence concerning the band's affairs until January 2008 when they would officially announce that vocalist Lynn Allers and guitarist Marc Hanson were no longer in the band. Bassist and founding member Dustin Mitchell assured fans in an interview that the band would continue on. On June 8 of 2008, Katagory V announced that Al Rybka (former frontman for Chicago-based metal band Bavmorda) would be taking over on vocals, and that Mike Theriot would be the band's new guitarist. This new line-up made its live debut in Salt Lake City exactly two months later, on August 8 of 2008.

After performing as the band's drummer for almost a decade, and also being a co-founder of Katagory V, Matt Suiter announced on November 30, 2008 that he was to retire from the band and the music business altogether.

Resurrect the Insurgence and break-up (2009-2015)

There were several months with no other activity in the band until February 23, 2009 when bassist Dustin Mitchell announced that he was the only remaining original member of the band, and that longtime guitarist and co-founder Curtis Morrell, and recently recruited guitarist Mike Theriot, had also left the band. Katagory V had temporarily broke up for a brief period, but as a founding member and key songwriter, Dustin Mitchell had decided to continue on under the Katagory V name, along with current vocalist Albert Rybka and newly recruited drummer Matthew "Bizzaro" Lefevre. On May 25, 2009 Dustin Mitchell stated the band had completed the writing process for an untitled fifth album, along with confirming the recent additions of guitarists Darrin Goodman and Kris Krompel.

In December 2009, the band would announce another change in personnel, stating that recently recruited Darrin Goodman was out of the band, and that former guitarist and songwriter Marc Hanson had rejoined. Katagory V performed their first live show in over a year to a sold-out venue in their hometown of Salt Lake City, Utah on January 9, 2010. The following month, the band mentioned in a press release that they would start recording their fifth album in April that same year, tentatively titled Resurrect the Insurgence. This would be the first album with bassist/founder/songwriter Dustin Mitchell handling the production duties. The band completed the recording of the album in January 2011, and in April, announced that producer Dennis Ward (Pink Cream 69, Primal Fear, Angra, Krokus) would be mixing and mastering the album.

Originally slated to be released in late 2011, Resurrect the Insurgence would be delayed for four years due to personal & financial set backs, as well as record label disinterest. In June 2014, Katagory V announced that the release of Resurrect the Insurgence would be funded through a kick starter campaign, and released directly and independently by the band themselves. The campaign would only draw in 56% of the funds needed to have the album released, and due to its failure, Bassist and foundling member Dustin Mitchell would officially put Katagory V to rest. As a parting gift to their fans, the band would release Resurrect the Insurgence digitally through Bandcamp on May 1, 2015.

Members
Current members
 Dustin Mitchell - bass guitar (1999–2015)
 Al Rybka - vocals (2008–2015)
 Mathew "Bizzaro" LeFevre - drums (2008–2015)
 Marc Hanson - guitars (2004–2007, 2009–2015)
 Kris Krompel - guitars (2009–2015)
Former members
 Ryan Taylor - guitars (1999–2002)
 Curtis Morrell - guitars (1999–2008)
 Trevor Asire - guitars (2003–2004)
 Mike Theriot - guitars (2008)
 Darrin Goodman- guitars (2009)
 Matt Suiter - drums (1999–2008)
 Lynn Allers - vocals (1999–2007)

Discography
Present Day (2001)
A New Breed of Rebellion (2004)
The Rising Anger (2006)
Hymns of Dissension (2007)
Resurrect the Insurgence (2015)

References

External links
Official website

Heavy metal musical groups from Utah
Musical groups established in 1999
American thrash metal musical groups
American power metal musical groups
American progressive metal musical groups
Musical quintets
1999 establishments in Utah